Franssen van de Putten was a Dutch ship deployed to the Dutch East Indies. It was named for Minister of Colonial Affairs and Dutch Prime Minister (briefly) Isaäc Dignus Fransen van de Putte.

Ships of the Netherlands